Pacu Jalur is a rowing race, which is held every year in Batang Kuantan river, along with the Pacu Jalur Festival, which is held as a cultural event of the traditional community of Kuantan Singingi Regency, Riau, in Indonesia. The race is arranged along with the celebration of Independence Day of the Republic of Indonesia. Pacu Jalur is the largest annual festival for the Kuantan Singingi district community, especially in the capital district of Taluk Kuantan located along the Kuantan river. This traditional event that has been passed down in Kuantan Singingi regency since hundreds of years ago, the culture has been held by the people of Kuansing until now. Pacu Jalur is a long boat rowing race, just like dragon boat race in  Malaysia and Singapore.

History
The history of the Pacu line begins in the 17th century. At the time the dug-outs or Jalur were used as a means of transport along the Kuantan river from the Kuantan Hulu at the source of the river all the way down to the Cerenti sub-district at the mouth of the Kuantan river. As ground transportation was not yet developed during that time, the route was actually used as an important means of transport for villagers, mainly used as a means of transporting crops, such as bananas and sugar cane, and serves to transport about 40-60 people. Later, these dug-out boats are painted or given decorations that include heads of snakes, crocodiles, tigers and sometimes added with umbrellas. In time its function shifted from being a mere transport means for the people, it became a splendid royal barge. This water-route gradually transformed from a means of transportation to part of social identity.

According to the historical record of the path began in Rantau Kuantan around the late 17th century, the beginning of the path is also used as welcoming honorable guests such as kings, sultans who visit to Rantau Kuantan. Since 1905 this turned into race and known as Pacu Jalur.

During the Dutch colonial rule Pacu Jalur was held to enliven the traditional celebrations, festivities of the people and to commemorate the birthday of the queen of the Netherlands Wihelmina that fell on 31 August. The festival used to start on 31 August to 1 or 2 September during Dutch era. Pacu Jalur celebration was contested for 2–3 days, depending on the number of tracks that follow.
It was also an event to commemorate the big days of Muslims such as Maulud Prophet, Idul Fitri or New Year Muharam. However, after the independence of Indonesia, the festival runway is intended to celebrate the Independence Day of the Republic of Indonesia Indonesia. Pacu Jalur festival is included in annual national tourist calendar of Indonesia as an event and on  August 23–26.

The rowing race
According to the language of the local population, Jalur means Boat. Before the main event of "Pacu Jalur 'is started, it usually held entertainment performances like singing and dancing performances to entertain all participants and surrounding communities. Nowadays, prior to the festival, smaller rowing events were held in four districts, followed by a traditional mini route held at Tepian Narosa Teluk Kuantan. The racetrack follows the flow of Batang Kuantan River, with a track length of about 1 km marked by six piles. The wooden boat those take part in the competition usually have a length of 25 to 40 meters and the width of the middle section of approximately 1.3 ms / d 1.5 m. The crew for each boat varies from 50 to 60 people. Each of the crew has his own task, there is the commander who shouts out instructions, the helmsman, another one leads the boat by dancing from left to right, while another provides the "music" to provide rhythm and ensure regularity to rowers. All these are in order that the boat moves fast forward in the right direction, provide balance, and rowers follow the same rhythm.

See also
Kuantan Singingi Regency

References

Riau
Tourist attractions in Riau
Festivals in Indonesia